Clarence Warwick Prentice (1 July 1891 – 10 March 1948) was an Australian rugby union and rugby league footballer who represented his country at both sports - a dual-code rugby international. He is the younger brother of fellow Wests player Ward Prentice.

Rugby union career
Prentice played rugby union with the Western Suburbs Rugby Club in Sydney and represented with the Wallabies as a prop in 1914 against the All Blacks.

Rugby league career
In 1915 Clarrie, and his brother Archie, joined the Western Suburbs Rugby League Club.

His international rugby league debut against New Zealand in Wellington on 23 August 1919, alongside Claud O'Donnell saw them become Australia's 20th and 21st dual code rugby internationals. It wasn't until 18 years later that Doug McLean jnr would become the next Australian dual representative.

Prentice was selected on the 1921–22 Kangaroo tour of Great Britain. He played in all three Tests of the tour and in 22 other tour matches for Australia.

He coached Western Suburbs in the 1927 NSWRFL season.

Sources
 Whiticker, Alan (2004) Captaining the Kangaroos, New Holland, Sydney
 Andrews, Malcolm (2006) The ABC of Rugby League, Aust'n Broadcasting Corp, Sydney

References

1891 births
1948 deaths
Australasia rugby league team players
Australia international rugby union players
Australia national rugby league team players
Australian rugby league players
Australian rugby union players
Dual-code rugby internationals
Rugby league players from Sydney
Western Suburbs Magpies coaches
Western Suburbs Magpies players
Rugby union players from Sydney
Rugby union props